The list of shipwrecks in 1895 includes ships sunk, foundered, grounded, or otherwise lost during 1895.

January

1 January

2 January

5 January

6 January

6 January

10 January

11 January

12 January

14 January

17 January

18 January

19 January

21 January

23 January

24 January

26 January

28 January

29 January

30 January

Unknown date

February

5 February

6 February

7 February

8 February

9 February

10 February

14 February

15 February

18 February

19 February

24 February

26 February

28 February

Unknown date

March

1 March

3 March

6 March

8 March

9 March

10 March

12 March

13 March

17 March

19 March

21 March

23 March

24 March

25 March

26 March

27 March

28 March

29 March

30 March

April

2 April

3 April

6 April

7 April

8 April

9 April

10 April

13 April

14 April

20 April

22 April

24 April

27 April

May

1 May

2 May

3 May

4 May

5 May

7 May

10 May

11 May

12 May

13 May

14 May

21 May

27 May

29 May

June

2 June

5 June

6 June

8 June

11 June

12 June

17 June

18 June

20 June

21 June

July

2 July

5 July

7 July

8 July

9 July

10 July

11 July

12 July

15 July

16 July

17 July

18 July

19 July

20 July

21 July

23 July

24 July

25 July

26 July

27 July

28 July

29 July

31 July

Unknown date

August

1 August

2 August

4 August

5 August

7 August

8 August

9 August

10 August

11 August

12 August

14 August

16 August

19 August

20 August

21 August

22 August

24 August

25 August

26 August

27 August

28 August

30 August

31 August

Unknown date

September

1 September

2 September

5 September

7 September

9 September

10 September

11 September

12 September

13 September

14 September

16 September

17 September

18 September

19 September

20 September

24 September

26 September

27 September

28 September

29 September

Unknown date

October

1 October

2 October

4 October

5 October

7 October

13 October

15 October

17 October

18 October

19 October

20 October

21 October

22 October

24 October

31 October

Unknown date

November

2 November

3 November

4 November

8 November

9 November

15 November

16 November

19 November

20 November

21 November

22 November

25 November

26 November

27 November

Unknown date

December

1 December

3 December

4 December

7 December

11 December

14 December

16 December

21 December

24 December

31 December

Unknown date

Unknown date

References

1895